Taikichiro Mori (森 泰吉郎, Mori Taikichirō, 1 March 1904 – 30 January 1993) was the founder of Mori Building Company.

Forbes ranked him as the richest man in the world during 1991-92, with a net worth of $15 billion in 1991 (approximately equivalent to $ in today's value). His sons, Minoru and Akira, headed Mori Building and the Mori Trust, respectively, and his granddaughter Miwako Date now runs the Mori Trust in her father's place.

Biography
Mori graduated from the Tokyo College of Commerce (now Hitotsubashi University) in 1928. He was appointed Professor at Kyoto Sericulture Technical High School (now Kyoto Institute of Technology) in 1932, and Yokohama Commercial School (now Yokohama City University) in 1946 where he served as Dean of the Faculty of Commerce from 1954 to 1959. While working for the University, he founded the Mori Building Company. After retiring from the University in 1959, he became the president of the Company.

References

20th-century Japanese businesspeople
Japanese business theorists
Academic staff of Yokohama City University
Hitotsubashi University alumni
1904 births
1993 deaths
Businesspeople from Tokyo
20th-century Japanese economists
Mori Building